Beaver Bank is a suburban community northeast of Lower Sackville on the Beaver Bank Road (Route 354) in Nova Scotia, Canada, within the Halifax Regional Municipality. It is about 35 kilometres from the City of Halifax.

History
Believed to be named after a large beaver dam by the first Loyalists settlers in the 1780s, the community of Beaver Bank dates back to 1776 when Boston Loyalist Mary Brown Parcel Barnstead and her son, John Henry Barnstead (1764–1861), arrived just after the American Revolution commenced. After the War of 1812, George and John Barrett, shopkeepers from Blackthorn, Oxford, England. In 1816, the Fultz family were granted a thousand acres (4 km²) of land. A museum bears their name in nearby Lower Sackville.

Other long standing families of this area include:
 Lively, the descendants of Reuben Lively ( 1756–1826), member of the Ninety-Six District. An American loyalist from South Carolina, he was granted 500 acres in the Rawdon Township after the American Revolutionary War in 1784.
 Shunamon (Schöenmann), descendants of Carl Ludwig Schöenmann (1740–1820) of Eisfeld, Germany. A former Hessian soldier in the American Revolutionary War, he arrived in Beaver Bank prior to or during the year 1813.
 Among the oldest family names are Dean, Langille, Gilby, Peters, Woods and Nicholson.

Grove Family
The Grove Family offers a rich contribution to Beaver Bank history. Originally from England, the siblings moved to Nova Scotia after living in Philadelphia for several years. The four Grove sisters quickly established a reputation in Halifax due to their prestigious finishing school in the Downtown area. They were described once as, "Those four English sisters whose ability and character influenced for good so large a number of young ladies of that generation."

Woodlands, the Grove residence, was built in Beaver Bank in 1847. The two Grove brothers lived on the property, profiting from saw-milling, brick-making, farming and box-making. In 1880 their sisters returned, and established the Grove School for Young Ladies in its place, which ran until destroyed by fire in 1943.

One or all of the Grove sisters is/are the writer(s) of what is thought to be the first piece of children's literature written in Nova Scotia, possibly even Canada, titled Little Grace or Scenes in Nova Scotia. The original book still remains with the Grove family to this day.

The sisters also are the main influence behind the construction of the first Anglican Church in Beaver Bank, in 1886: The Church of the Good Shepard. The Original church was sold in 1998 to a private buyer and removed from its foundation and its proper standing place. Today is it located in the township of Chester and used for private purposes. Frances Shunamon (McCarron, née Grove) donated the land in her newly developed "Shunamon Subdivision" to house the newer and current Church of the Good Shepard, which still stands today.

Beaver Bank Station
Beaver Bank was the location of construction camps and taverns in the mid 1850s during the construction of Nova Scotia's first railway, the Windsor Branch of the Nova Scotia Railway under direction of Joseph Howe, the first Chief Commissioner. Tensions between Protestant and Catholic workers resulted in a large riot at Beaver Bank. The railway opened in June 1857 with a station and freight shed at Beaver Bank. It was replaced by a second structure in 1886. The station served the Sackville/Beaver Bank area until 1956, creating business opportunities for lumbermen by shipping to Halifax. After the closing of the station in 1956 the original train station was sold and moved to be a private residence and in the mid 1960s was destroyed by fire. The last train across the tracks at Beaver Bank was on November 2, 2010.

Daniel Hallisey, of County Cork, Ireland, was one of the builders of the original railway. He became the first Station Master. In 1856 he built a house/hotel next to the station, which many say served more as a tavern than anything. This Hotel was lost in a fire and a new one was built behind the station road in 1872. The new hotel/house offered the new assets of a telegraph and post office, which ran for 99 years. Sir Robert Borden was often present at this house for entertainment. 

Today, the Hallisey Hotel remains at the corner of the Beaver Bank Road and Windgate Drive (formerly known as the Beaver Bank Windsor Junction Crossroad). It had been converted into a pub called the Black Crow, which closed. In early-2014, construction began on the building to renovate and re-open it to the public. On July 11, 2014, the building re-opened as the Beaver Bank Station, a pub and restaurant.

Beaver Bank "Radar"
RCAF Station Beaver Bank was a long-range Pinetree Line early warning radar station operated by the Royal Canadian Air Force, located in Beaver Bank.

RCAF Station Beaver Bank was approximately 40 km (25 mi) north of Halifax-Dartmouth. The station sat on 430 acres (1.7 km²) with about a half a mile (800 m) separation between the domestic and the operations site; both sites being divided by the county line between Halifax County (domestic site) and Hants County (operations site).

The "22 Aircraft Control & Warning Squadron" was the operational unit posted to the station, its colours having been created in 1953 and the unit made operational a year later in the fall of 1954. The radar unit itself was manually operated and reported to the Fredericton NORAD Sector at RCAF Station St. Margarets until September 1962 when this was changed to the Bangor NORAD Sector at Topsham AFS, Maine.

The 22 AC&W became SAGE-operational on January 1, 1964; however, this capability did not last long as the station was closed and the squadron disbanded four months later on April 1, 1964, following a NORAD realignment and increasing focus being placed on the DEW Line. After the closure of the base, it had been used briefly as a cement factory.

Royal Canadian Air Force (RCAF) Station Beaver Bank occupied a unique location in proximity to Canada's largest Atlantic seaport and its biggest naval base, making it an important early warning radar during the manual environment of the 1950s. Since manned bomber raids by the Soviet Union in the area were considered quite likely, it was felt that RCAF Station Beaver Bank fulfilled a critical role in the early days of Canada's and North America's air defence. The station was originally financed by the United States Air Force, although operational responsibility rested with the RCAF, until 1962 when the RCAF assumed financial responsibility as well. In the mid-1970s the base was converted for a short time to a cement plant. This was only used for a few years before the base was abandoned completely.

Early entertainment
Residents of Beaver Bank in the 1950s had close access to the First Sackville Drive-In Theatre, and the Sackville Downs Raceway (now Downsview area, Sackville Drive).

Spelling 
Beaver Bank is often misspelled as "Beaverbank" as it was misprinted on provincial signs for much of the 1980s and 1990s. After the community rallied together in protest for many years, the province re-issued the signs with the correct spelling. There are still some signs in the province that have not been fixed.

As some early texts such as newspapers spelled Beaver Bank as one word, many of the older residents still consider that spelling to be correct. The spelling has always been debated because technically it should be "Beaver Bank" and yet it has always been and always will be "Beaverbank" to its native residents.

Facilities and businesses

Convenience stores
Chen's Convenience (formerly Yohanna's Variety) - As Yohanna's Variety this store was featured in the television series Trailer Park Boys in Season 1 Episode 1. It is located on cross-section between Beaver Bank Road and Woodbine Drive (recently renamed Welkin Drive).
Beaver Bank Guardian Pharmacy - located near Beaver Bank Pizza - 309 Beaver Bank Road.
Joey's Convenience & Video - located on the corner of Tucker Lake Road. Building was condemned in September 2016 and the store is no longer in business. The building has since been taken down and has been replaced by Tucker Lake Pizza.
 BeaverBank Convenience - located just past West Avenue when going north - 2409 Beaver Bank Road.

Restaurants
Beaver Bank Pizza - located on the cross-section between Beaver Bank Road and Woodbine Avenue.
Foosing Chinese Restaurant - located before the Beaver Bank Pharmacy.
Tucker Lake Pizza - located on the corner of Tucker Lake Road and Beaver Bank Road.
Beaver Bank Station - located on the corner of Windgate Drive and Beaver Bank Road.

Golf

Lost Creek Golf Club: an 18-hole championship golf course within a residential community - located in Lost Creek Subdivision.
Emerson Ridge Driving Range - Located across from the Beaver Bank Brown Hall and Chen's Convenience on the Beaver Bank Road.

Facilities
Beaver Bank Community Hall (Brown Hall) - located across from Emerson Driving Range and beside Chen's Convenience. 
Beaver Bank Community Centre - located on the Beaver Bank Road beside the Beaver Bank Kinsac Volunteer Fire Department, in front of Beaver Bank Kinsac Elementary School. Re-opened 24 November 2012.
Ivy Meadows Continuing Care Facility (formerly Scotia Nursing Homes Ltd.) - 51 bed nursing facility, located 15 km on the Beaver Bank Road from Sackville Drive.
Beaver Bank Kinsac Lions Club - located here at 40 Sandy Lake Road

Emergency facilities
Beaver Bank Volunteer Fire Department - located beside the Beaver Bank Community Centre, on the Beaver Bank Road.
Beaver Bank Dispatch - located on the Beaver Bank Road; beside Beaver Bank Kinsac Volunteer Fire Department.

Camps and day care facilities

Harold T. Barrett Fun Forest Camp - located on the Beaver Bank Road, past Kinsac. Beaver Bank Lake south of camp. property of 2nd Beaver Bank Scouting Group.
First Memories Daycare - located on the Beaver Bank Road beside Woodbine Mobile Home Park.
Peachtree Children's Centre - located at 971 Windgate Drive (formerly known as the Beaver Bank Windsor Junction Cross Road). Located inside of Crossroads Wesleyan Church beside the Beaver Bank Station.
Rachael's Daycare - located in Rivendale subdivision near Beaver Bank Monarch Elementary School.
Beaver Bank Homework Club - located off Beaver Bank Road - Opened its doors March 2015 - Welcomes children K to 9.

Residential areas

Mobile home parks
Woodbine Mobile Home Park - located on the Beaver Bank Road. Population of 2,512 (estimate). Roughly 628 trailers/mobile homes.

Subdivisions
Greenforest Subdivision - located beside Barrett Lake.
Barrett Subdivision - located just past Harold T. Barrett Junior High School.
Monarch/Rivendale Subdivision - located near Beaver Bank Monarch Drive Elementary School and Majestic Avenue.
Lost Creek Subdivision - located near Tucker Lake.
Shunamon Subdivision - located between Grove Avenue and Barrett Subdivision.
Lakeridge Estates - located just past the Beaver Bank-Kinsac Ball field, off the Beaver Bank Road.
Davis Subdivision - located in North Beaver Bank, shortly after Lakeridge Estates

Schools

Elementary schools
Beaver Bank - Kinsac Elementary School - Grades K-5
Beaver Bank Monarch - Drive Elementary School - Grades K-5

Junior high schools
Harold T. Barrett Junior High School - Grades 6-8

High schools
Lockview High School - In Fall River - Grades 9-12

References

Harvey, Robert P., Images of Our Past: Historic Sackville

External links
Beaver Bank on Destination Nova Scotia
HRM Civic Address Map
Beaver Bank - Kinsac Elementary School
Beaver Bank - Monarch Drive Elementary School
Harold T. Barrett Junior High School
Beaver Bank Official Site
2nd Beaver Bank Scouting Group
The Brown Hall

Communities in Halifax, Nova Scotia